"Wings of a Butterfly" (released as "Rip Out the Wings of a Butterfly" on the album) is a song by Finnish gothic rock band HIM. It is the second track on their fifth studio album, Dark Light (2005), and was released as the album's first single that year. The song reached number one in Finland and Hungary, number 10 in Germany and the United Kingdom, and number 87 in the United States, making it the biggest single from Dark Light worldwide. The music video, filmed at Union Station in Los Angeles, was number one on the Rock Countdown on MTV2 in late 2005 for five weeks until it was retired.

Track listings
Finnish and European maxi-CD single
 "Wings of a Butterfly"
 "And Love Said No" (616 version)
 "Vampire Heart" (live at Donington)
 "Wings of a Butterfly" (video)

European CD single
 "Wings of a Butterfly"
 "Poison Heart" (Ramones cover)

US DVD single
 "Wings of a Butterfly" (video)
 Making of "Wings of a Butterfly"

Charts

References

2005 singles
2005 songs
HIM (Finnish band) songs
Music videos directed by Meiert Avis
Number-one singles in Finland
Number-one singles in Hungary
Sire Records singles
Songs written by Ville Valo